Sijtse Jansma (22 May 1898 – 4 December 1977) was a Dutch tug of war competitor who competed in the 1920 Summer Olympics. In 1920 he won the silver medal as a member of the Dutch tug of war team.

References

External links
profile

1898 births
1977 deaths
Olympic tug of war competitors of the Netherlands
Tug of war competitors at the 1920 Summer Olympics
Olympic silver medalists for the Netherlands
Sportspeople from Leeuwarden
Olympic medalists in tug of war
Medalists at the 1920 Summer Olympics
20th-century Dutch people